{{DISPLAYTITLE:C9H22NO2PS}}
The molecular formula C9H22NO2PS (molar mass: 239.31 g/mol, exact mass: 239.1109 u) may refer to:

 EA-2192
 VM (nerve agent)